Rincón de Luz is a fictional orphanage and the primary setting for the first four, and the last two seasons of the Argentine television series Chiquititas. The exceptions are Chiquititas Season Five, where the story takes place in a granary, and Chiquititas Sin Fin, in which the children have a different home.

Rincón de Luz (literally "Corner Of Light") is also the title of a Chiquititas spin-of series that shares a similar plot, created by Cris Morena. The title Rincón de Luz replaced the previous one of Chiquititas, since Morena could not use the previous title due to copyright issues. Soon before its premiere, she stated that Chiquititas was "more than a title".
The same name is used in the Chiquititas feature film.

The manor is located at the Pasaje del Sauce, 829, in Buenos Aires.

Story

Before the Corner
The original Rincón de Luz orphanage was idealized by Ramiro Morán, in order to hide his new born granddaughter, whose mother, Gabriela, was too young and had the baby with a humble man. The baby grew up in the house, and became Mili, the first "orphan" to be sheltered by the place. She lived with Saverio, the adorable Chef of the Moráns, and Ernestina, its rigorous janitor. The place then became home of seven other girls, who were actually orphans, and formed among themselves a family, they all guilded by Mili.

The orphans periodically received the visit of Belén, Saverio's endearing goddaughter who was studying to become a social assistant. They were also monitored by Emilia, the first woman to direct the orphanage, until she was fired by Carmen, an ambitious woman, and Ramiro's sister. She always managed to control his whole fortune, and wanted the own the house where Rincón de Luz was located. The house was also wanted by Ginette, Ramiro's ultimate (and several years younger) fiancée, whose father was supposedly its original owner.

Through Ramiro, Ginette then replaced Emilia as the orphanage's administratrix, what prevented Belén to accept Martín's proposal to occupy the position. Martín was Ramiro's son and Belén's first romantic interest in the series, and the first one to offer her a position she would later assume.

Ginette initially proved to be lovable to the chiquititas, but was later unmasked by Jimena, one of them. 
Belén was then nominated the newest Rincón de Luz director by Ramiro himself, moments before his tragic death, and so she became. Her act would change the orphan's lives forever.

The Corner of Light
After Carmen managed to own the house, Belén and the orphans were forced to leave their home, until a mysterious man, Pedro Vega, donated them a new one. Their newest house was a huge manor located at the corner of the Pasaje del Sauce street. The place then became the ultimate version of Rincón de Luz.
The orphans discovered that some areas and artefacts inside the manor were actually magical, such as La Ventanita de Los Sueños (The Magic Window), that took place in the attic (Belén's bedroom). Through the Window, the orphans could see their inner dreams and illusions becoming truer to life. The Window shared a similar function with a magic mirror, where the children could see their dreams if looking with only one eye.
The manor also had some areas that could work as traps, and other hidden places.

This new setting was introduced at the same time the story gained new overtones. The melodramatic plots were left as the number of adult characters was reduced, giving place to more children-centered plots.

The Granary
Years after Belén and her chiquititas storyline ended, the Book of Life, in which she had written their story, was somehow found by Maria, a girl who lived in the streets with some other children. They later found a huge, picturesque granary, where Joaquin, a lonely old man, lived. His only company was an enormous tree, located in the middle of the granary, until the place then became the children's newest home. Following the Book's stories, Maria names it Rincón de Luz.

An adorable woman called Ana arrived from the skies in a ballon, and gradually assumed Belén's role in the life of the granary's orphans. She fell in love with Juan Maza, a widowed man who lived nearby the granary in his mansion, with his seven children, and Ana changed his life as well.

The granary was burned down after they got married and left for honeymoon, by Juan's angry ex-fiancée Pía. She managed to send the orphans (alongside some of Juan's children, as well as her own daughter Tali) to a household where kids where treated as slaves, the Shadow orphanage. There, a shiny leaf felt right on Maria's hands, which Toya explained that the Tree was saying goodbye to them. Camila interpreted this as an advice for the chiquititas, to not lose their hope. Pía insanely burned down the granary, and died in her own fire.
After escaping from the Shadow house, the children discovered that Ana and Juan died in an airplane crash, and that now they were left orphans, and homeless.

Back to the Corner
Fearing being sent back to the Shadow house, the remaining chiquititas stood homeless. Maria insistently kept the Book of Life, believing that to be the right moment to find the original Rincón de Luz described in the story. Following a magic star, they were then sent to the manor in the Corner, which was the very same from the past, except for its insides.

The orphans discover a chimerical place full of toys, dolls and games, and through the Magic Window in the attic, they discover that they actually found their Rincón de Luz, as Belén herself tells them in a vision.
Somehow, the manor also became a gateway to a magical world inhabited by elves and fairies (where Maria befriends Tok the Elf). Also, in the library, the fairy tales come from their books to life.

The reason the house was reformed is later clarified to the orphans through old documents found by them in a hidden office inside the manor. The house's owner, Rafael Sander, wanted it to be exclusively reformulated for his upcoming son. Unfornunately, his pregnant wife died in a car crash, and Sander was left in sorrow. His loyal valet Enzo tries to expel the orphans from the manor, stating that "it was an orphanage, now it's a private place". The kids stay insistent against Sander's bitterness.

He hid himself in the manor's hidden places, lurking the children and a newcomer young woman named Luz, but was later discovered by Juanita. Luz became the newest maternal figure for the orphans, and later the orphanage's director, after it is legalized by the Juvenile Court. She had to struggle against Sander's angry and Paula's ambition to own the house she believes is hers. 
Paula was Sander's deceased wife's identical twin sister, who had always loved him, and still does, but in the end Luz and Sander get married, and he gives the manor to Luz as a gift.

Due to the villainous acts of Lidia (a unscrupulous woman who assumed the house's administration in Luz and Rafael's absence), the manor was knocked down, leaving the children in desperation. However, the manor magically rebuilt itself for them, as the spirit of Belén appeared in the skies.

In film
In the Chiquititas feature film, the name of "Rincón de Niños Huerfanos" ("Corner for Orphans") is changed to "Rincón de Luz" after Belén, Alejo and the children assume the house, becoming altogether a family.

Other versions
In the successful Brazilian adaptation of the story, the orphanage is named Raio de Luz ("Light Gleam"), and features adventure and fantasy stories unexplored in the original version, such as the children discovering a hidden treasure in the manor's surroundings. The manor was supposedly destroyed in the end of Season Four, and was set to return as a main setting in future seasons (which did not happen due to Chiquititas Brasil cancelation).

Also, in this version, the Tree located in the middle of the granary is a gateway to a magical subterranean Wonderland-like world known as The Anthill. There, the orphans meet fantastic creatures, such as talking ants and flowers. No explanation about its origin is given, although Estrela tells the orphans that the Tree was there years before she was born. The granary was built around the Tree in order to protect it.

References 

Chiquititas
Fictional buildings and structures
Orphanages